Karl G. B. Richter (14 December 1876 – 30 November 1959) was a Swedish sport shooter who competed in the 1920 Summer Olympics and in the 1924 Summer Olympics.

In 1920 he won the bronze medal as member of the Swedish team in the team clay pigeons competition. He also participated in the individual trap event but his result is unknown. Four years later he finished fifth with the Swedish team in the team clay pigeons competition.

References

External links
profile

1876 births
1959 deaths
Swedish male sport shooters
Olympic shooters of Sweden
Shooters at the 1920 Summer Olympics
Shooters at the 1924 Summer Olympics
Olympic bronze medalists for Sweden
Trap and double trap shooters
Olympic medalists in shooting
Medalists at the 1920 Summer Olympics
Sport shooters from Stockholm
19th-century Swedish people
20th-century Swedish people